Bernhard Afinger (6 May 1813 – 25 December 1882) was a German sculptor.

Biography
Afinger was born in Nuremberg, where he studied old German sculptures.  He was for a time a silversmith, and in 1840 began instruction under Christian Daniel Rauch at Berlin. Among his pupils was Rudolf Uffrecht. He died in Berlin, aged 69.

Works

In portrait medallions and works of a religious character he was particularly successful. There is an Arndt memorial by him at Bonn, a university memorial at Greifswald, and a statue of Newton in the National Museum, Pesth.

Further reading 
 Hannelore Hägele. "Afinger, Bernhard." In Grove Art Online. Oxford Art Online, (accessed January 18, 2012; subscription required).

References

External links 
 
Entry in the Deutsche Fotothek

Artists from Nuremberg
1813 births
1882 deaths
19th-century German sculptors
German male sculptors
19th-century German male artists